Christine Sagen Helgø (born 27 March 1968 in Holmestrand, Norway) served as mayor of Stavanger from 2011 to 2019 representing the Conservative Party of Norway, Høyre. Sagen Helgø has seen twelve years of Stavanger's politics, the last eight years as group leader of Stavanger Høyre. In 2011 she replaced the former mayor of the same party, Leif Johan Sevland, who held the title for sixteen years.

Sagen Helgø is also the president of the World Energy Cities group for the 2014–2016 term.

References

1968 births
Conservative Party (Norway) politicians
Living people
Women mayors of places in Norway
People from Holmestrand